Pegasus is a genus of seamoths found in coastal tropical marine waters. The name was taken from the winged horse Pegasus in Greek mythology. This horse was created with Medusa´s blood. The member species are distributed in the Indo-West Pacific Ocean waters around: Australia, Bahrain, China, India, Indonesia, Japan, Malaysia, Mozambique, Myanmar, the Philippines, Saudi Arabia, Singapore, Taiwan, Tanzania and Thailand.

Species
There are currently 5 recognized species in this genus:
 Pegasus lancifer Kaup, 1861 (Sculptured seamoth)
 Pegasus laternarius G. Cuvier, 1816 (Brick seamoth)
 Pegasus volitans Linnaeus, 1758 (Long-tail seamoth)
 Pegasus tetrabelos Osterhage, Pogonoski, Appleyard & W. T. White, 2016 (Short-spined seamoth) 
 Pegasus sinensis Ying-Yi Zhang, Rong-Rong Zhang, Shao-Bo Ma, Shuai-Shuai Liu, Qiang Lin and Xin Wang], 2022 (Chinese seamoth)

References

 
Gasterosteiformes
Taxa named by Carl Linnaeus